Christopher John Sutton-Mattocks (born 10 July 1951) is an English barrister and former first-class cricketer. 

The son of Terry Sutton-Mattocks, he was born at Hammersmith in July 1951. He was educated at Winchester College, before going up to St Edmund Hall, Oxford. While studying at Oxford, he played first-class cricket for Oxford University 1972 and 1973, making six appearances. He scored 107 runs in his six matches, at an average of 8.91 and a high score of 37. Sutton-Mattocks also played List A cricket for Oxford in the 1973 Benson & Hedges Cup, making four appearances. 

A member of the Middle Temple, he was called to the bar in July 1975. He stood for the SDP–Liberal Alliance in Maidstone in the 1987 general election, finishing second to Ann Widdecombe. He was appointed a recorder in 1996, but stepped down in March 1998 following allegations of impropriety against a pupil at his chambers. He continues to work as a barrister and is a governor at Sevenoaks Preparatory School.

References

External links

1951 births
Living people
People from Hammersmith
People educated at Winchester College
Alumni of St Edmund Hall, Oxford
English cricketers
Oxford University cricketers
English barristers
Liberal Party (UK) parliamentary candidates
Social Democratic Party (UK) parliamentary candidates